Pablo Sebastián Bueno (born 30 March 1990) is an Argentine professional footballer who plays as a forward for Jaguares de Córdoba.

Career
Bueno's youth career was spent with CAI and Defensa y Justicia. He made his professional debut for the latter in March 2009, during a goalless draw with Quilmes in Primera B Nacional. Five appearances later, Bueno scored his first senior goal in 2–1 defeat to Tiro Federal. A total of twenty-one appearances and five goals arrived over the next four seasons for Defensa y Justicia. In January 2012, Bueno joined Primera B Metropolitana side Flandria on loan. He scored on his debut against Estudiantes on 28 January, which was the first of seven goals in nineteen appearances for Flandria.

He rejoined Flandria for a second loan for the 2012–13 season. He went onto again score seven goals, in thirty-seven games, as the club finished 15th. In June 2013, Bueno was loaned to Defensores de Belgrano. Eight goals in thirty-nine appearances occurred. Subsequent loans to Platense (Primera B Metropolitana) and Gimnasia y Esgrima (Primera B Nacional) followed where he played a total of fifty-one matches and scored eight times. On 1 January 2016, Bueno rejoined Flandria on loan again. Two goals in seventeen games came during 2016, a season concluded ended with promotion.

Bueno returned to Defensa in July 2017 prior to immediately rejoining Flandria on loan for a fourth time in August. After finishing his loan with Flandria, Bueno left Defensa y Justicia permanently to sign for Almirante Brown on 30 June 2018. He made his bow in a 2–0 loss to Estudiantes on 20 August, before netting his opening goal against San Telmo on 29 August. Eight goals, including two over Deportivo Español, followed in thirty-three total matches. In June 2019, Bueno agreed terms with Jaguares de Córdoba of Colombia's Categoría Primera A. His debut arrived versus Unión Magdalena on 13 July.

Career statistics
.

Honours
Flandria
Primera B Metropolitana: 2016

References

External links

1990 births
Living people
People from General Roca
Argentine footballers
Association football forwards
Argentine expatriate footballers
Expatriate footballers in Colombia
Argentine expatriate sportspeople in Colombia
Primera Nacional players
Argentine Primera División players
Primera B Metropolitana players
Categoría Primera A players
Defensa y Justicia footballers
Flandria footballers
Defensores de Belgrano footballers
Club Atlético Platense footballers
Gimnasia y Esgrima de Jujuy footballers
Club Almirante Brown footballers
Jaguares de Córdoba footballers